Rajamangala University of Technology Hantra Campus Stadium is a multi-purpose stadium in Ayutthaya Province (full name Phra Nakhon Si Ayuttaya), Thailand.  It is currently used mostly for football matches and is the home stadium of Ayutthaya F.C.

Football venues in Thailand
Multi-purpose stadiums in Thailand
Buildings and structures in Phra Nakhon Si Ayutthaya province
Sport in Phra Nakhon Si Ayutthaya province